Roy Winton Wood (August 29, 1892 – April 6, 1974), nicknamed "Woody", was a professional baseball player. He played all or part of three seasons in Major League Baseball from 1913 through 1915 for the Pittsburgh Pirates (1913) and Cleveland Naps/Indians (1914–1915). A native of Monticello, Arkansas, he attended University of Arkansas. 
 
In a three-season career, Wood posted a .231 batting average (77 hits in 333 at bats) with one home run and 20 RBI in 119 games, including 33 runs, 12 doubles, four triples and seven stolen bases. He played first base and all three outfield positions.

Wood died in Fayetteville, Arkansas, at the age of 81.

External links

Retrosheet

Major League Baseball first basemen
Major League Baseball outfielders
Pittsburgh Pirates players
Cleveland Naps players
Cleveland Indians players
Sioux City Packers players
Cleveland Spiders (minor league) players
Toledo Iron Men players
Arkansas Razorbacks baseball players
Baseball players from Arkansas
1892 births
1974 deaths